Mikhail Vladimirovich Fishman (born 1972) is a Russian journalist and television presenter. He has anchored the Dozhd TV program  «И так далее» ("And so on") since 2010. Fishman also wrote columns for Forbes, Die Welt and the Russian business daily Vedomosti. He has previously contributed to many publications and edited several including the weeklies The Moscow Times and the Russian Newsweek.

Early life 
Fishman was born on 3 December 1972 in Moscow. He is a grandson of biophysicist Mikhail Volkenstein and nephew of film director Vladimir Alenikov. He is Jewish. He graduated in 1995 from the philology department of Lomonosov Moscow State University.

Career 
Fishman has worked for several  media outlets in Russia, often concurrently supplying material for more than one publication. After graduating, he worked first for radio station Echo of Moscow and newspaper Kommersant, and later for such outlets as Russkiy telegraf «Русский телеграф» and the magazines Results «Итоги» and Internet «Интернет». Between 1998 and 2003 he was a journalist, reviewer and editor for the internet publications «Полит.ру» (polit.ru) and «Еженедельный журнал» (ejforever.com). From 2000-8 he wrote articles for the internet publication «Газета.Ru» (gazeta.ru).

In 2004 he joined the newly created Russian edition of Newsweek as a political commentator, and became deputy editor under chief editor Aleksandr Gordeev. After a break from Jan-Nov 2006 as a special correspondent for Kommersant, Fishman returned to Newsweek as political editor. In Sept 2008 he succeeded Kyrill Aleksandrovich as Russian Newsweek'''s editor-in-chief.  Fishman remained as editor of Russian Newsweek  until October 2010, when  its owner, Axel Springer Russia, the Russian subsidiary of the German media concern Axel Springer AG terminated publication "for economic reasons".

In November 2008, Fishman was awarded the Paul Klebnikov Prize for Excellence in Journalism. Fishman had been with Klebnikov as the latter was dying after he was attacked on a Moscow street in 2004.

In March 2010 Fishman was reportedly smeared in a sting involving hookers and cocaine. Fishman was quoted by The Sunday Times as saying the "KGB style tactic" was a signal to independent journalists to keep a low profile.

In 2013 he became editor-in-chief of an online paper startup project for Moscow's metropolitan area, Cityboom, and remained until it was closed in July 2014.

In the autumn of 2015 Fishman became editor-in-chief of the English-language paper The Moscow Times. The last printed edition was published on 6 July 2017, and Fishman left the organisation.

Since 2015 he has presented an annual program Conversation with Dimitry Medvedev on Dozhd TV. His weekly current affairs discussion show And so on with Mikhail Fishman'' appears on the same channel each Friday evening. That show discusses major events of the past seven days, puts them into context and examines their implications.

In a 2017 opinion contribution to CNN, Fishman lamented the pressures that he blamed for "the decline of editorial freedom and professional integrity in journalism in Russia".

References

External links
 Mikhail Fishman on Facebook
 Biography at Lenta.ru (Russian language)
 Interview with Fishman in Die Zeit, 28 November 2013

Living people
1972 births
Russian Jews
Russian journalists
Russian newspaper editors
The Moscow Times
Russian activists against the 2022 Russian invasion of Ukraine